Pretty Lady may refer to:

 Pretty Lady (album), 1961 album by Les McCann
 "Pretty Lady" (Keith Stegall song), 1985
 "Pretty Lady" (Lighthouse song), 1973
 "Pretty Lady" (Tash Sultana song), 2020
 "Pretty Lady", song by the Canadian band Trooper
 "Pretty Lady", song from the musical Pacific Overtures
 Pretty Lady, the musical play at the centre of the film 42nd Street

See also
Pretty Girl (disambiguation)
Pretty Woman (disambiguation)